The 2006 Grand Prix of Road America was the twelfth round of the 2006 Bridgestone Presents the Champ Car World Series Powered by Ford season, held on September 24, 2006 at Road America in Elkhart Lake, Wisconsin. Dan Clarke took the pole, the first and only of his Champ Car career. A. J. Allmendinger won the race, his fifth and last win of the year and his Champ Car career. The event is most remembered for a horrific crash involving Katherine Legge that resulted a 42-minute red flag. The rear wing on her car failed just before the high speed Turn 11 Kink, the unexpected loss of downforce caused her to crash violently into the catch fence, demolishing the car. Legge was uninjured in the incident.

Qualifying results

Race

Caution flags

Notes

 New Race Record A. J. Allmendinger 1:54:43.700
 Average Speed 107.967 mph

Championship standings after the race

Drivers' Championship standings

 Note: Only the top five positions are included.

External links
 Friday Qualifying Results 
 Saturday Qualifying Results 
 Race Results
 Weather Information
 Katherine Legge crash video

Road America
Grand Prix of Road America
Champ Car Grand Prix of Road America